The Temisas Astronomical Observatory is an astronomical observatory on the island of Gran Canaria in the Canary Islands, Spain.

The observatory was opened in 2008 and is operated by the Fundación Canaria Observatorio de Temisas.

Facilities
Temisas Observatory is mostly aimed at an educational and tourist market, and runs a regular program of public events.

The observatory has a Meade LX600 ACF  Schmidt–Cassegrain telescope with a  mirror, f8. Additionally it has a range of smaller telescopes for visitors, an exhibition hall and a visitors' centre.

References

External links 

Astronomical observatories in the Canary Islands
Buildings and structures in Gran Canaria
Science and technology in Gran Canaria
2008 establishments in Spain